The word Atchafalaya derives from the Choctaw term hacha falaia, meaning "long river".

Atchafalaya may refer to:

 Atchafalaya, Louisiana, Ghost town in Louisiana, U.S.
 Atchafalaya River, Louisiana, U.S.
 Atchafalaya Basin or Atchafalaya Swamp, wetlands surrounding the lower part of the Atchafalaya River, Louisiana
 Atchafalaya Basin Bridge
 Atchafalaya Swamp Freeway, a portion of Interstate 10 in Louisiana that includes the bridge
 Atchafalaya National Heritage Area
 Atchafalaya National Wildlife Refuge
 Atchafalaya Golf Course at Idlewild, Patterson, Louisiana
A song from the album Sylva, by jazz ensemble Snarky Puppy